The 2019 IAAF World Relays was held in Yokohama, Japan from May 11 to May 12, 2019. Two new events were established for 2019, both mixed events: the  relay and the shuttle hurdles relay. The first event replaced the  relay that featured at previous events.

Medal summary

Men

Women

Mixed

Medal table

Team standings
Teams scored for every place in the top 8 with 8 points awarded for first place, 7 for second, etc. The overall points winner was given the Golden Baton.

Participating nations
43 nations took part in the competition.

References

External links
 Official website
IAAF website

 
World Athletics Relays
IAAF World Relays
IAAF World Relays
International athletics competitions hosted by Japan
Sports competitions in Yokohama
IAAF World Relays